Brian MacDevitt is a lighting designer and educator. He has worked extensively on Broadway and Off Broadway, as well as touring, Regional theatre, and Industrial productions. He won the Tony Award for Best Lighting Design for his work on the 2002 Broadway revival of Into The Woods. He also won the Tony Award for Best Lighting Design in a Play three times and the Tony Award for Best Lighting Design in a Musical once for The Book of Mormon in 2011.

Early life and education 
A Long Island, New York, native, MacDevitt went to Ward Melville High School in East Setauket. Afterwards, he attended SUNY Purchase and graduated with a degree in Lighting Design from the Department of Design/Technology of the Division of Theatre Arts & Film.

Career 
After graduation Brian spent a decade honing his craft with Off Broadway and other productions, and also developed a reputation as a teacher of design. He began teaching at Purchase as a visiting professor in 1986. He continued to balance his teaching career while breaking into Broadway in 1994 with What's Wrong With This Picture? Brian started to achieve notice with the Terrence McNally play Love! Valour! Compassion! in 1995. His success continued through the 1990s, and eventually culminated with a Tony Award for Best Lighting Design in 2002 for the revival of Into the Woods. He won again in 2005 for The Pillowman,  in 2007 for The Coast of Utopia, sharing the award with Kenneth Posner and Natasha Katz (The three also won the Drama Desk Award for Outstanding Lighting Design for Utopia.) 

In fall of 2009, Brian began working as an Associate Professor of lighting design at the University of Maryland, College Park, where he is still teaching. He also designed the revival of Neil Simon's Brighton Beach Memoirs, Broadway Bound and David Mamet's new play Race. In the 2010 season he designed A Behanding in Spokane, Fences, Armida at The Metropolitan Opera, and Women on the Verge of a Nervous Breakdown. In 2011 he designed The Book of Mormon, Le comte Ory at The Metropolitan Opera and The House of Blue Leaves. Brian won the Tony in 2009 for his lighting of the play Joe Turner's Come and Gone and again in 2011, for the musical Book of Mormon.

Productions

Broadway 

 What's Wrong With This Picture? – 1994
Love! Valour! Compassion! – 1995
Master Class – 1995
Summer and Smoke – 1996
Sex and Longing – 1996
Present Laughter – 1996
Side Show – 1997
Proposals – 1997
The Diary of Anne Frank – 1997
Wait Until Dark – 1998
Night Must Fall – 1999
True West – 2000
The Ride Down Mt. Morgan – 2000
The Dinner Party – 2000
Judgment at Nuremberg – 2001
The Invention of Love – 2001
A Thousand Clowns – 2001
Major Barbara – 2001
Urinetown – 2001
The Women – 2001
Morning's at Seven – 2002
Into the Woods – 2002
Frankie and Johnny in the Clair de Lune – 2002
Tartuffe – 2003
 Nine – 2003
Long Day's Journey Into Night – 2003
The Retreat from Moscow – 2003
Henry IV (Parts 1 and) 2) – 2003
Fiddler on the Roof – 2004
Match – 2004
A Raisin in the Sun – 2004
'night, Mother – 2004
Pacific Overtures – 2004
Good Vibrations – 2005
The Pillowman – 2005
Sweet Charity – 2005
Absurd Person Singular – 2005
The Color Purple – 2005
The Wedding Singer – 2006
The Coast of Utopia (Part 1 - Voyage) – 2006The Vertical Hour – 2006Inherit the Wind – 2007Cymbeline – 2007A Catered Affair – 200813 – 2008Speed-the-Plow – 2008American Buffalo – 2008You're Welcome America – 2009
 Blithe Spirit – 2009Joe Turner's Come and Gone – 2009Accent on Youth – 2009Brighton Beach Memoirs – 2009Race – 2010A Behanding in Spokane – 2010Fences – 2010Women on the Verge of a Nervous Breakdown – 2010The Book of Mormon – 2011The House of Blue Leaves – 2011The Mountaintop – 2011Chinglish – 2011Death of a Salesman – 2012Betrayal – 2013A Raisin in the Sun – 2014This Is Our Youth – 2014A Delicate Balance – 2014Fish in the Dark – 2015Blackbird – 2016The Front Page – 2016Carousel – 2018The Waverly Gallery – 2018The Minutes – TBDPlaza Suite – TBD

 Touring 

 Gigi (1984-1985)
 Can-Can (1988-1989)
 Angels in America: Millennium Approaches (1994-1996)
 Master Class (1996-1997)
 Urinetown (2003-2004)
 The Color Purple (2007-2010)
 The Book of Mormon Tours
 Latter Day Tour (2012-2016)
 Jumamosi Tour (2012-2020)

 West End 

 The Book of Mormon – 2021

 Off-Broadway Splendid Mummer – 1988The Waves – 1990Subfertile – 1990Light Shining in Buckinghamshire – 1991Fayebird – 1991Shmulnik's Waltz – 1991Man, Woman, Dinosaur – 1992And – 1992Candide – 1992Goodnight Desdemona (Good Morning Juliet) – 1992Three Hotels – 1993Krapp's Last Tape – 1993Later Life – 1993The Maids – 1993Family Secrets – 1993First Lady Suite – 1993The Illusion – 1994The Mayors of Boy Town – 1994The Arabian Nights – 1994The Triumph of Love – 1994Dog Opera – 1995Northeast Local – 1995Master Class – 1995Blue Window – 1996
 Overtime – 1996Nude Nude Totally Nude – 1996A Line Around the Block – 1996By the Sea, By the Sea, By the Beautiful Sea – 1996Henry V – 1996God's Heart – 1997Mizlansky Zilinsky or 'Schmucks' – 1998Corpus Christi – 1998The Ride Down Mt. Morgan – 1998Captains Courageous – 1999East is East – 1999The Taming of the Shrew – 1999The Exact Center of the Universe – 1999An Experiment with an Air Pump – 1999Fuddy Meers – 2000The Time of the Cuckoo – 2000Lydie Breeze (Parts 1 and 2) – 2000Spinning Into Butter – 2000Juno and the Paycock – 2000Comic Potential – 2000Resident Alien – 2001Urinetown – 2001Speaking in Tongues – 2001Homebody/Kabul – 2001
 Tuesdays with Morrie – 2002Blue/Orange – 2002Kimberly Akimbo – 2002Lone Star Love – 2004Dog Sees God – 2005Family Secrets – 2006The House in Town – 2006Pig Farm – 2006Our Leading Lady – 2007The Receptionist – 2007The Seagull – 2008Hold On to Me Darling – 2016

 The Metropolitan Opera 

 Armida – 2010 
 Le comte Opry'' – 2011

Awards and nominations

Tony Awards

Drama Desk Awards

References

External links

American lighting designers
Living people
People from Long Island
Year of birth missing (living people)
State University of New York at Purchase alumni
Tony Award winners
University of Maryland, College Park faculty
Ward Melville High School alumni